This is a list of rugby league footballers who have represented the Ireland national rugby league team.

Players
Up to and including against Wales in the 2017 Rugby League World Cup at Perth Oval on 12 November 2017

See also 
 List of Great Britain national rugby league team players
 Ireland national rugby league team match results
 Ireland A national rugby league team

References

External links
 Statistics at rugbyleagueproject.org
 RL Ireland Squad
 Community Four Nations Wales Dragonhearts v Ireland Wolfhounds

 Ireland
 
Ireland